The Boston Society of Natural History (1830–1948) in Boston, Massachusetts, was an organization dedicated to the study and promotion of natural history. It published a scholarly journal and established a museum. In its first few decades, the society occupied several successive locations in Boston's Financial District, including Pearl Street, Tremont Street and Mason Street. In 1864 it moved into a newly constructed museum building at 234 Berkeley Street in the Back Bay, designed by architect William Gibbons Preston. In 1951 the society evolved into the Museum of Science, and relocated to its current site on the Charles River.

History

Founders of the society in 1830 included Amos Binney Jr.; Edward Brooks; Walter Channing; Henry Codman; George B. Emerson; Joshua B. Flint; Benjamin D. Greene; Simon E. Greene; William Grigg; George Hayward; D. Humphreys Storer; and John Ware. Several had previously been involved with the Linnaean Society of New England. By 1838, the society held "regular meetings on the 2nd and 4th Wednesday of each month." "In its collection are about 700 specimens in mineralogy and geology, besides the rich collection of Dr. C.T. Jackson, and the state collection; botany, 5,000; mammalia, 30 entire skeletons and 30 crania; birds, 200 species; reptiles, 130; insects, about 15,000; crustacea, 130; radiata, 190. Library, 600 volumes and pamphlets. The room ... gratuitously opened to the public every Wednesday from 12 to 2 o'clock."

In 1864, William Johnson Walker, a surgeon and financial supporter of the society, donated money for the Walker Prize to recognize work in the field of natural history. In the 1960s its scope was extended to all areas of science and with an emphasis on communication as well as excellence. One of the recipients, while he was a first year student at the Lawrence Scientific School (which later became part of Harvard University) was the zoologist William Patten.

Among the many scholars and curators affiliated with the society: Alexander Emanuel Agassiz; T.T. Bouvé; Thomas Mayo Brewer; George Emerson; A.A. Gould; F.W.P. Greenwood; Charles Thomas Jackson; Charles Sedgwick Minot; Albert Ordway; Samuel Hubbard Scudder; Charles J. Sprague; Alpheus Hyatt, and Jeffries Wyman.

"After World War II, under the leadership of Bradford Washburn, the society sold the Berkeley Street building, changed its name to the Boston Museum of Science. ... The cornerstone for the new Museum was laid at Science Park [in 1949] and a temporary building was erected to house the Museum's collections and staff. In 1951, the first wing of the new Museum officially opened."

Galleries

1830–1833

1833–1863

1864–1946

See also
 Boston Journal of Natural History, published by the society (1834–1863)
 Museum of Science (Boston)

References
Notes

Further reading
Publications of the society
 Act of incorporation, constitution, and by-laws of the Boston Society of Natural History. John H. Eastburn, printer, 1832. 
 Boston Journal of Natural History. v.1 (1834–1837); v.2 (1838–1839); v.4 (1843–1844); v.5 (1845–1847); v.6 (1850–1857); v.7 (1859–1863).
 Proceedings of the Boston Society of Natural History. v.1 (1841–1844); v.34 (1907–1912)
 Memoirs Read Before the Boston Society of Natural History. (1861–1949). v.1 (1866–1869).
 Objects and claims of the Boston Society of Natural History. Printed by J. Wilson and Son, 1861. 
 Annual report. (1865–1876)
 Alpheus Spring Packard. Observations on the glacial phenomena of Labrador and Maine. 1867.
 Louis Agassiz. Address delivered on the centennial anniversary of the birth of Alexander von Humboldt. 1869. (The lecture took place at Music Hall, followed by a reception at Horticultural Hall).
 Anniversary memoirs of the Boston Society of Natural History, 1830–1880. Boston, 1880.
 Lucien Carr. Notes on the crania of New England Indians. 1880.
 William James. The feeling of effort. 1880.
 Museum and Library bulletin. 1906. 
 Douglas Wilson Johnson. A geological excursion in the Grand Cañon district. 1909.
 Bulletin of the Boston Society of Natural History. 1915. 
 P. Creed, ed. The Boston Society of Natural History, 1830–1930. Boston: 1930.

External links

 Boston Museum of Science
 Hancock Library, University of Southern California. Acquired the library of the Boston Society of Natural History in 1944–1946.
  (Describes items given to the Boston Society of Natural History in the 1830s)

Organizations based in Boston
History of Boston
1830 establishments in Massachusetts
Natural history museums in Massachusetts
19th century in Boston
Natural history societies